Prince John Konstantonovich of Russia, formerly Grand Duke John Konstantinovich of Russia (5 July 1886 – 18 July 1918), sometimes also known as Prince Ivan or Prince Ioann or Prince Johan, was the eldest son of Grand Duke Konstantin Konstantinovich of Russia by his wife, Yelizaveta Mavrikievna, née Princess Elisabeth of Saxe-Altenburg. He was described by contemporaries as a gentle, religious person, nicknamed "Ioannchik" by his relatives.

Early life

Ioann Konstantinovich was born as a Grand Duke of Russia with the style Imperial Highness, but at the age of 9 days, a Ukaz of his cousin Emperor Alexander III of Russia stripped him of that title, as the Ukaz amended the House Law by limiting the grand-ducal title to grandsons of a reigning emperor. As a result, he received the title Prince of the Imperial Blood (Prince of Russia) with the style Highness.

He once entertained the possibility of becoming an Orthodox monk, but eventually fell in love with Princess Helen of Serbia, the daughter of King Peter I of Serbia and his wife Princess Zorka of Montenegro, niece of Grand Duchess Militza, Grand Duchess Anastasia of Russia and Queen Elena of Italy. They married on 2 September 1911, and Helen took the name Princess Yelena Petrovna of Russia. As a daughter of the reigning King, after the marriage, she retained her style of Royal Highness and as such she had the right to receive foreign diplomats in her own right, unlike her husband. They had a son, Prince Vsevolod Ivanovich (20 January 1914 – 18 June 1973), and a daughter, Princess Yekaterina Ivanovna (12 July 1915 – 13 March 2007), who was the last member of the Imperial Family to be born before the fall of the dynasty, and was ultimately to become the last surviving uncontested dynast of the Imperial House of Russia.

Revolution and death
Prince Ioann fought in the First World War of 1914-1918, was decorated as a war hero, and was at the front when the Russian Revolution of 1917 started. In April 1918 the  Bolshevik authorities exiled him to the Urals, and in July the same year had him murdered in a mineshaft near Alapayevsk, along with his brothers Prince Konstantin Konstantinovich and Prince Igor Konstantinovich, his cousin  Prince Vladimir Pavlovich Paley, and other relatives and friends.

His body was eventually buried in Beijing, in the cemetery of the Russian Orthodox Mission, which was destroyed in 1986 to build a park. His sister  Princess Vera Konstantinovna, mother Grand Duchess Yelizaveta Mavrikievna and wife Princess Yelena Petrovna left Russia in April 1919 with help from the King of Norway. His daughter Princess Yekaterina married Ruggero, Marquis  Farace di Villaforesta. Yekaterina lived in Buenos Aires and later in Montevideo, Uruguay where she died in 2007. His sister  Princess Vera Konstantinovna, the youngest daughter of Grand Duke Konstantin Konstantinovich, died in New York in 2001, aged 94.

Ancestry

See also

Romanov sainthood
Karađorđević family tree

1886 births
1918 deaths
People from Pavlovsk, Saint Petersburg
People from Tsarskoselsky Uyezd
Princes of royal blood (Russia)
Russian military personnel of World War I
19th-century people from the Russian Empire
Executed people from Saint Petersburg
Murdered Russian royalty
Victims of Red Terror in Soviet Russia
Executed royalty
Eastern Orthodox royal saints
Burials in Beijing